Campins can refer to:

Campins, Barcelona, Catalonia, Spain
3327 Campins, main belt asteroid